FIBA EuroBasket Division B was the lower tier of the EuroBasket Tournament. At the same time that Division A had the European Championship, division B had a championship to determine which teams would get promoted into division A for the following year.

Group Phase

Group A 

Rules=1) Points; 2) Head-to-head results; 3) Points difference; 4) Points scored.

Group B 

Rules=1) Points; 2) Head-to-head results; 3) Points difference; 4) Points scored.

Group C

Best Runner-Up

Promotional Phase

Statistical Leaders

Points

Rebounds

Assists

External links
 Full Results

2007
FIBA EuroBasket 2007
2006–07 in European basketball
2007–08 in European basketball